The, Park Jung Min (stylized as THE, PARK JUNG MIN) is the first Korean mini album of Park Jung-min of South Korean boy band SS501. It was released on 1 April 2011. A limited edition of the album, Wara Wara The, Park Jung Min, was released in Japan on 25 May 2011.

The album contains five tracks including his debut single "Not Alone" plus two instrumentals and a 40-page photobook.

Track listing

Music videos
 "Like Tears Are Falling"

Release history

Charts

Sales and certifications

References

External links
 
 

SS501 albums
2011 EPs
Kakao M EPs